Lieutenant-General (ret.) Syed Arif Hasan (born 11 Nov 1950) is a Pakistani sports administrator and retired three-star rank general officer in the Pakistan Army. He is the current president of the Pakistan Olympic Association. He was also elected unopposed as the Vice President of the Olympic Council of Asia in 2007. He also served as chairman of organizing committee of 9th SAF Games Islamabad.

Military career
As a Major General he served as Vice Chief of General Staff. In Oct 2001 he was promoted to rank of Lieutenant-General and appointed commander X corps, Rawalpindi. Later in September 2003 he was appointed commander I Corps, Mangla.

2004 South Asian Games
While still serving in army Arif Hasan was appointed chairman of organizing committee of 9th SAF Games Islamabad. SAF Games were originally scheduled in Islamabad in October 2001 but were postponed over security fears after 9/11. They were then rescheduled for March 2002 but were again postponed due to border tensions between Pakistan and India. In March 2002 year Pakistan was forced to cancel the event due to the war in Iraq.

The Games were finally held in 2004.

Pakistan Olympic Association
Gen Arif Hassan was elected President of Pakistan Olympic Association in November 2004. He was reelected in 2008 and again in 2012.

Two term limit issue
Pakistan Sports Board which comes under government of Pakistan in its 2005 sports policy put a two term limit on office bearers of sports federations. The policy was reaffirmed by Supreme Court of Pakistan in 2011. Gen Arif Hassan refused to accept this decision taking a plea that it violates the Olympic Charter. In 2012 he was re elected to a third term. While government formed a parallel committee. International Olympic committee threatened to ban Pakistan. Finally in July 2014 Pakistan Sports board and Government recognized Arif Hasan as president of POA.

Olympic Council of Asia
Gen Arif Hasan was elected unopposed as the Vice President of the Olympic Council of Asia in 2007.

Archery Federation of Pakistan
In addition to president of Pakistan Olympic Association he is also president of Archery Federation of Pakistan.

References

Pakistani generals
Living people
1950 births
Pakistani sports executives and administrators
People from Lahore